St Mary's Lifeboat Station is situated in St Mary's Harbour, Isles of Scilly and has been an important station for the Royal National Lifeboat Institution since the service began in 1837, however without a service between 1855 and 1874.

History

A lifeboat station was provided in 1874 at a cost of £280. In 1899 this was replaced by a new station at Carn Thomas with a slipway, at a cost of £1,500.

The lifeboat house was adapted in 1914 to receive a new motor lifeboat, but this didn't arrive on the station until 1919.

Since the arrival of the Robert Edgar in 1981, the lifeboat has been moored in the harbour, rather than the lifeboat house.

Lifeboats at St Mary's

Awards
St Mary's Lifeboat has received fifty-six awards for gallantry, including 26 RNLI medals for bravery, comprising one gold, nine silver and 16 bronze. The most recent was in 2004 when bronze medals were awarded to Coxswain Andrew Howells and Crew Members Mark Bromham and Philip Roberts for the rescue of an injured man from a yacht on 29 October 2003.

See also

St Agnes Lifeboat Station (Isles of Scilly)
List of RNLI stations

References

External links
RNLI station information

History of the Isles of Scilly
Lifeboat stations in the Isles of Scilly
Lifeboat